Boogaloo is an album by American organist John Patton recorded in 1968 but not released on the Blue Note label until 1995.

Reception

The Allmusic review by Scott Yanow awarded the album 2½ stars and stated "this is a routine and now-dated set of commercial late-'60s jazz-funk".

Track listing
All compositions by John Patton except where noted
 "Boogaloo Boogie" - 5:25
 "Milk and Honey" - 8:20
 "Barefootin'" (Robert Parker) - 7:07
 "Shoutin' But No Poutin'" - 7:43
 "Spirit" - 5:52
 "B&J (Two Sisters)" - 7:12

Personnel
Big John Patton - organ
Vincent McEwan - trumpet
Harold Alexander - tenor saxophone, flute
George Edward Brown - drums
Richard Landrum - conga

References

Blue Note Records albums
John Patton (musician) albums
1995 albums
albums produced by Francis Wolff